Najwa Alimi is an Afghan journalist and human rights activist. She won the 2019 Per Anger Prize for her efforts supporting human rights and freedom of speech. Alimi was born in Fayzabad, Badakhshan. She moved to Kabul to study chemistry and journalism. Alimi works for Zan TV and runs a book café with friends.

References

External links 

 

Living people
Year of birth missing (living people)
Afghan journalists
21st-century Afghan women writers
Afghan women activists
Afghan human rights activists
Per Anger Prize
People from Badakhshan Province